The Dolphin Research Center (DRC) is a dolphinarium on Grassy Key, Florida. The  series of saltwater lagoons is home to several dolphins and California sea lions.

History
Fisherman Milton Santini opened Santini's Porpoise School in 1958, which he operated until 1972.
Santini blasted lagoons into the seashore with dynamite to create deeper pens for the dolphins.
One of Santini's dolphins, Mitzi, starred in the film Flipper.
The property was sold and renamed as Flipper's Sea School in 1972 and operated under this name until 1977.
At this point, it was purchased by Jean Paul Fortom-Gouin.
Fortom-Gouin closed the property to the public, running it as the Institute for Delphinid Research until 1983.
The Dolphin Research Center was founded in 1984 by Armando ("Mandy") and Jayne Rodriguez.
Mandy had earlier been a dolphin trainer at Miami Seaquarium and decided to interact with dolphins in a manner less "circus-y".

Animals
As of 2022, DRC listed 25 dolphins as currently residing at its facilities.
Twenty-four of the dolphins are bottlenose dolphins, while the other dolphin is an Atlantic spotted dolphin.
Twenty-one of the dolphins were born in captivity. 
Four of the bottlenose dolphins and the Atlantic spotted dolphin were rescued from the wild.
It is also home to three sea lions, several exotic birds, and 2 African Spurred Tortoises.

Guest experience
Visitors to the DRC can come in under general admission to see the dolphins and sea lions demonstrate behaviors, research, training, and other activities in narrated behavior sessions throughout the day. They can also pay to experience a variety of interactive programs either in the water or from a floating dock.
In addition to the general admission price, guests can pay more to interact with dolphins in the water.
DRC also has an "Ultimate Trainer for the Day" program where guests can shadow and participate in activities with trainers and a "Researcher Experience" where they can shadow the DRC research team.
Other guest experiences can include painting with a dolphin or providing enrichment.

Research
DRC staff members conduct and publish research on its captive dolphins. They study a wide variety areas in dolphin cognition, behavior, and husbandry. These are just a few of the many studies they have published:

In a 2010 study "Blindfolded Imitation in a Bottlenose Dolphin (Tursiops truncatus)" and a follow-up 2013 study "Switching strategies: a dolphin’s use of passive and active acoustics to imitate motor actions", researchers tested the ability of a blindfolded dolphin to imitate the behavior of another dolphin or human.
The blindfolded dolphin was able to replicate the behaviors of fellow dolphins by presumably recognizing the sound; when copying behaviors of a human in the water, it switched to using echolocation to ascertain the behavior being modeled.

In a 2018 publication "Bottlenose dolphins can understand their partner's role in a cooperative task" DRC staff tested the ability of bottlenose dolphins to coordinate their behavior to receive a reward.
In a trial, pairs of dolphins were instructed to swim across their lagoons and press an underwater button, with each dolphin assigned a button.
In some trials, both dolphins were given the command at the same time; in other trials, one dolphin would receive the command up to 20 seconds before the other.
Trials were considered successful if the dolphins pressed the buttons at the same time (within one second).
The dolphins learned to coordinate their actions, with the first dolphin to receive the command eventually waiting for the second dolphin to receive its command before acting.
This demonstrated that dolphins are capable of coordinated action in pursuit of a common goal.

Studies have also been published that demonstrates that dolphins understand some numbers concepts and other research that explores maternal use of signature whistles. The center has also published a study that shows that dolphins in human care in the U.S. live as long or longer than dolphins in the wild. The center has also collaborated with Duke University researchers on dolphins' energy expenditures.

Education
The Center operates the Dolphin Research Center Training Institute, (formerly the College of Marine Mammal Professions).
Students can earn an associate degree Occupational Associates Degree in Marine Mammal Behavior, Care and Training after completing a 36-week program.

DRCTI also offers a Professional Animal Trainer program to provide more experience and continuing education to trainers of all animal species.

DRC Training Institute is accredited by the Accrediting Commission of Career Schools and Colleges (ACCSC) #M072566 and Licensed by the State of Florida Commission for Independent Education (CIE) #4766.

Issues and controversy
In 2004, the Sun-Sentinel alleged that the Dolphin Research Center failed to report the birth and death of a dolphin calf to the National Marine Fisheries Service in 2001, nor did it report the birth of a calf in 2002.
The National Marine Fisheries Service is required to keep a record of captive marine mammal births, deaths, and transfers in the United States.

After Hurricane Andrew struck the Florida Keys in 1992, the DRC dolphin "Annessa" escaped or was washed out of her sea pen.
Opponents of dolphin captivity including Ric O'Barry allege that Annessa is an example of a captive-born dolphin successfully transitioning from captivity to wild life, which could be an argument for releasing such dolphins back into the wild.
However, the DRC disputes that Annessa was able to transition to life back in the wild.
They state that there was one credible sighting of her immediately after the storm, verified via photograph.
Of the photograph, Mandy Rodriguez stated, "it was clear that Annessa had already lost a considerable amount of weight and was not sustaining herself in the wild. Unfortunately, Annessa was never seen again and there is no evidence to suggest that she survived long term."

References

Aquaria in Florida
Cetology
Dolphinariums
Tourist attractions in the Florida Keys
Buildings and structures in Monroe County, Florida
Biological research institutes in the United States
Research institutes in Florida